Ramin or Rāman is a town and union council of Dera Ghazi Khan District in the Punjab province of Pakistan.

History 

Long ago the Thingani Balouchs, a sub-tribe of the Marri Balouchs from Balochistan, migrated to the western valley of the Indus River. The Thingani tribe has ruled Rāman for many years. The well-known Sardars of Rāman were Sardar Jamak Khan Thingani (Jamak-I) and his grandsons Sardar Jamak Khan Thingani (Jamak-II) and Sardar Gulzar Khan Thingani.

Sardar Jamak Khan Thingani (Jamak-II) had four sons:
 Sardar Qurban Hussain Khan Thingani
 Sardar Qadir Bakhsh Khan Thingani
 Sardar Usman Khan Thingani
 Sardar Siddique Khan Thingani

The second Sardar, Sardar Gulzar Khan Thingani, also had four sons:
 Sardar Ghulam Hassan Khan Thingani (Surname: Namazi) 
 Sardar Ghulam Hussain Khan Thingani (Numbardar)
 Sardar Atta Muhammad Khan Thingani
 Sardar Durr Muhammad Khan Thingani

These days the most stable Thingani family in Rāman is the Jamakani family which descended from Sardar Jamak Khan Thingani (Jamak-I), Sardar Jamak Khan Thingani (Jamak-I) was grandfather of Sardar Jamak Khan Thingani (Jamak-II) and Sardar Gulzar Khan Thingani. The Thingani family descended from Sardar Jamak Khan Thingani (Jamak-I) has ruled the town of Rāman for many years.

The main ruling tribe in Rāman is the Thingani tribe.

References

Populated places in Dera Ghazi Khan District
Union councils of Dera Ghazi Khan District
Cities and towns in Punjab, Pakistan